The Kingdom of Bhaktapur, also known as Bhadgaon, was a kingdom ruled by the Malla dynasty of Nepal from 15th century until its annexation in the 18th century. It was established in 1482 after King Yaksha Malla died and his sons divided the valley into four kingdoms: Bhaktapur, Kantipur, Patan, and Banepa. Banepa, however, was soon annexed by or submitted itself to Bhaktapur. 

In 1769, It became part of the Gorkha Kingdom―present day Kingdom of Nepal―after an aggressive unification campaign launched by Prithvi Narayan Shah.

History 
Since the reign of the first Malla king, Arimalla, over Kathmandu Valley, Bhadgaon had always been at the center of political events. After the lineage of Arimalla ended with Jayadeva Malla in 1258, it was the residence of House of Tripura. The Tripura House, along with its main rival from Banepa, the House of Bhonta played a prominent part in shaping the valley as it stood at that time. Eventually, the Bhonta House declined and Tripuras enjoyed full authority in the valley.

In 1353, Jayasthiti Malla, was brought from the south by Devaladevi, the de facto head of Tripura House, and she married him to Rajalladevi, her granddaughter. Yakshya Malla was the grandson of Jayasthiti, and all the later rulers of the valley descended from him.

Monarchs 
The following table provides a list of monarchs of Bhadgaon with their regnal dates.

References

Citations

Bibliography 
 
 
 
 
 
 
 
 

15th-century establishments in Nepal
18th-century disestablishments in Nepal
Empires and kingdoms of Nepal
Former countries in South Asia
Malla dynasty
States and territories disestablished in the 1760s
States and territories established in 1428